Goldman's diminutive woodrat (Nelsonia goldmani) is a species of rodent in the family Cricetidae.
It is found only in Mexico.

References

Musser, G. G. and M. D. Carleton. 2005. Superfamily Muroidea. pp. 894–1531 in Mammal Species of the World a Taxonomic and Geographic Reference. D. E. Wilson and D. M. Reeder eds. Johns Hopkins University Press, Baltimore.

Nelsonia (rodent)
Mammals described in 1903
Taxonomy articles created by Polbot
Taxa named by Clinton Hart Merriam